The Light Meets the Dark is the second major label studio album from Christian pop rock band Tenth Avenue North. It was released on May 11, 2010 by Reunion Records.

Background
Vocalist Mike Donehey said: "On this record I really tried to be honest about how messed up I am. We wanted it to be a collision between our hearts and God's truth. His grace collides with the dark inside of us. His blood can cover us and I'm trying to call people out and say 'Look, please do not hide your darkness. Expose that to the light.' I know that's the scariest thought, but its where freedom and healing starts to take place. It's where it all starts to happen."

Track listing

Awards
The album was nominated for a Dove Award for Pop/Contemporary Album of the Year at the 42nd GMA Dove Awards.

Charts

Weekly charts

References

Tenth Avenue North albums
2010 albums
Reunion Records albums